Wien Aspern Nord is a railway station serving Donaustadt, the twenty-second district of Vienna. It is the eastern terminus of the Vienna S-Bahn line S80 and adjacent to the Aspern Nord U-Bahn station.

Services 
 the following services stop at Wien Aspern Nord:

 REX: hourly service between Wien Hauptbahnhof and Bratislava.

References

External links 
 
 

Railway stations in Vienna
Austrian Federal Railways